Back to Back, also known as American Yakuza 2, and Back to Back: American Yakuza 2, is a 1996 American action film. It is directed by Roger Nygard and written by Nygard and Scott Nimerfro (who is credited under the name, Lloyd Keith). The film was produced by W.K. Border, Thomas Calabrese, Takashige Ichise, Aki Komine, Michael Leahy, and Joel Soisson. It stars  Michael Rooker, Ryo Ishibashi, and Danielle Harris. It is a sequel to the 1993 film, American Yakuza.

Plot
An explosive situation erupts when a mob war thrusts a yakuza, an ex-cop, and his adolescent daughter into a deadly, no-win situation. Booted in disgrace from the L.A. police force Bob Malone suffers a seemingly endless unlucky streak. Matters don't improve when a robbery led by a crazed criminal transpires at the bank where Malone is filling out foreclosure papers. Witnessing the crime, something inside Malone snaps and he single-handedly wipes out most of the robber gang. Unfortunately, the ringleader escapes and Malone ends up jailed by his corrupt former colleague Lt. Tony Dussecq. At the same time, two Japanese yakuza arrive in L.A. to deliver a special message to L.A.'s most prominent Mafia don. The yakuza are in a restaurant when the bank robber (wearing a vest covered with explosives) bursts in and threatens to blow the place up. One of the Japanese, Koji, intervenes in an explosive sequence. He too ends up at the police station just as Malone's feisty teen daughter Chelsea arrives with bail money. The yakuza suddenly escapes, taking Chelsea and Malone with him as hostages. Now pursued by the crooked coppers and the mob, the unlikely threesome have no choice but to team up to survive.

Cast
 Michael Rooker as Bob Malone
 Ryo Ishibashi as Koji
 Danielle Harris as Chelsea Malone
 John Laughlin as Lieutenant Tony Dussecq
 Koh Takasugi as Hideo
 Bobcat Goldthwait as The Psycho
 Vincent Schiavelli as Leonardo
 Stephen Furst as Jimmy
 Tim Thomerson as Thomas
 Fred Willard as a Loan Officer
 Frank D'Amico as DeLorenzo
 Leland Orser as The Wheelchair Guy
 Jake Johannsen as Officer Jones
 Yasushi "Bert" Kojima as Joe "Snapper"
 Michael "Wheels" Parise as Eddie "Little Eddie"
 Nick Dimitri as Vince
 Michael Caradonna as Chad
 Steve Peri as Elvis
 Peter Mele as Lafayette
 Bob Delegall as Sergeant Donahue
 Scott Leva as Officer Williams 
 Jon Ross as Officer Tucker
 Steve Akahoshi as Officer Yamaoka
 Ron MacLachlan as Officer Ross
 Randall Huber as Officer Bryant
 Christy Harrell as Joe Snappers Girl #1
 Dawn Morgan as Joe Snappers Girl #2
 Peggy Vesperman as Joe Snappers Girl #3
 Michael Ray Miller as Deviant
 John P. McGarr as Goon

Release
The film premiered at the Oldenburg International Film Festival on August 29, 1996. It was first shown in the United States on the premium cable television network, HBO on October 25, 1996.

Home media
It was released on VHS on July 14, 1998 through BMG video label. It was also released on DVD through Fox Lorber on July 5, 2000. It was released on DVD by Medusa on October 7, 2002 under the title, American Yakuza 2. On July 28, 2003 Prism Leisure released the film on DVD also under the title, American Yakuza 2.

References

External links
 
 
 

1996 films
1990s English-language films
American sequel films
American crime action films
Films directed by Roger Nygard
1990s American films
Yakuza films